The Eva Gabor Show is a talk show that aired in 1953–54.   The show was hosted by and starred Eva Gabor. Gabor, an actress, had previously appeared on Broadway and in television shows. The Eva Gabor Show series aired for 15 minutes weekly and had different celebrity guests.

References

American television talk shows
1953 American television series debuts
1954 American television series endings